Colvin–Fant–Durham Farm Complex, also known as the Nicholas Colvin House and Durham House, is a historic home and farm complex and national historic district located near Chester, Chester County, South Carolina.  The district encompasses six contributing buildings. The house was built about 1835, and is a vernacular farmhouse with transitional Federal and early Greek Revival detailing. The house consists of a two-story, hall and parlor plan, frame main block and a one-story, frame dining room and kitchen ell, which was added in the late-19th century. The property also includes a smokehouse, well house/power house, mule barn, tenant house, and a log cottonseed house.

It was listed on the National Register of Historic Places in 1992.

References

Farms on the National Register of Historic Places in South Carolina
Historic districts on the National Register of Historic Places in South Carolina
Houses completed in 1835
Federal architecture in South Carolina
Greek Revival houses in South Carolina
Buildings and structures in Chester County, South Carolina
National Register of Historic Places in Chester County, South Carolina